The Villa Ingenheim is an historic building in the suburbs west of Brandenburg Potsdam.  Located at Zeppelinstraße 127/128, the property was used by the German Armed Forces Military History Research Office (since 2013, the Center for Military History and Social Sciences of the Bundeswehr).

Buildings and structures in Potsdam
Villas in Brandenburg
Landmarks in Germany